Fernão Martins da Fonseca Coutinho (born 14th-century) was a Portuguese nobleman, Lord of Couto de Leomil. His parents were Esteban Martins de Leomil and Urraca Rodrigues da Fonseca.

Biography 

His parents were Estevão Martins de Leomil and Urraca Rodrigues da Fonseca. Fernaö was married to Teresa Pires Varela.

References

External links 
doria.genealogias.org

14th-century Portuguese people
Medieval Portuguese nobility